FC Audin is a football club of East Timor. The team plays in the Timorense Liga Pre.

References

External links
FC Audin at national-football-teams.com

Football clubs in East Timor
Football